In college football, games in which 100 points are scored by a single team are rare, especially since 1940. In the post-World War II era, it is considered in poor form to run up the score of lopsided games. There have been only three occurrences since 1970, and just one since 2000.

On October 25, 1884, Yale defeated Dartmouth 113–0, becoming the first team to score 100 points in a game. The next week, Princeton defeated Lafayette 140-0.

The most points scored by a single team, and the most lopsided final score in college football history, occurred on October 7, 1916 when Georgia Tech beat Cumberland 222–0. Only two other programs have scored at least 200 points in a single game: King College, now King University, defeated Lenoir 206-0 in 1922 and St. Viator College beat Lane College (IL) 205-0 in 1916.

Fifteen programs have scored at least 150 points in a game: Albion, Arizona, Bowling Green, Central Oklahoma (twice), Dayton, Georgia Tech, Harvard, King (TN), Millikin, Missouri S&T, Oklahoma (twice), Pittsburg State, St. Viator, Stevens and Tulsa (twice).

It is rare for a team to have scored in a game when the opponent scored over 100 points, but several cases exist, including when SMU kicked an early field goal but Rice "came back" to win 146–3 in 1916.

Early records are often incomplete and sometimes contradictory. Scores without footnotes listed in the table below have been confirmed in at least two sources, usually The Football Thesaurus and the football media guide of one of the corresponding schools. A footnote by the score indicates a separate single reference source. The table includes not only scores from NCAA programs, but also from those that compete in the National Association of Intercollegiate Athletics and from games played before the advent of the NCAA or NAIA.

List of 100-point games

Breakdown of list
As a supplement to the list, the following summarizations are provided.

Team appearances on list
Oklahoma leads the pack of most 100+ point victories with 8, followed by Georgia Tech with 5. Wesleyan holds the distinction of losing the most 100+ point games with 5, where Kingfisher College and Oklahoma Baptist are second with three each.

Excluding games in the 19th century and early 1900s, the Houston Cougars are the only current FBS team to score 100 points against another FBS team, against Tulsa in 1968.

A total of 19 teams have both won and lost 100 point games: Amherst, Arkansas, Colorado, Idaho State, King (TN), Louisville, Marion Military Institute, Michigan State, Missouri School of Mines (now Missouri S&T), NC State, New Mexico, North Central, Northern Illinois, Pacific (OR), Penn State, Pittsburg State, Rochester, Tulsa, and Virginia.

Virginia and Pacific (OR) are the only teams to win and lose a 100-point game in the same season. In 1890, Virginia lost to Princeton 115-0 and defeated Randolph-Macon 136-0. In 1923, Pacific (OR) lost to Chemawa Indian School 104-0 and beat George Fox, then called Pacific College, 118-0.

Least margin of victory
In only one game did the losing team score more than 7 points, with North Central scoring 32 points in 1968 and North Park winning by "only" 72 points.

Games by decade
The 1920 season produced the most 100 point games in a single year with 17, but the 1910s proved to be the decade with the most 100 point games with 96. From 1910 to 1929, a total of 147 games were played with 100 points scored by one side, meaning 67.7% of all such games were in this 20-year period.

Notes

References
 College Football Data Warehouse (http://www.cfbdatawarehouse.com )
ESPN College Football Encyclopedia
 The Football Thesaurus: 77 years on the American Gridiron, Deke Houlgate (author), Los Angeles: Nash-U-Nal Publishing Company, 1954.

Lists of college football team records
L